Louis Wellington Parore (26 December 1888 – 3 March 1953), also known as Lou Parore, was a New Zealand Māori leader, interpreter, land court agent. Of Māori descent, he identified with the Ngāpuhi and Te Roroa iwi. He was born at Te Houhanga Marae, Northland, New Zealand in 1888.

References

1888 births
1953 deaths
Interpreters
Te Roroa people
Ngāpuhi people
20th-century translators